The CONCACAF Nations League is an international association football competition contested by the senior men's national teams of the member associations of CONCACAF, the regional governing body of North America. The tournament takes place on dates allocated for international friendlies on the FIFA International Match Calendar. A one-time qualifying tournament took place from September 2018 to March 2019 and the inaugural tournament began in September 2019.

History and format
The tournament was announced in November 2017. It is divided into three tiered leagues, A, B, and C, of four groups each, with promotion and relegation between the leagues based on finishing position within groups. The group winners of League A enter a four-team knockout competition to be crowned champion, while the group-winners of Leagues B and C are promoted to the next tier. In Leagues A and B, the four teams at the bottom of the groups are relegated to the next-lower tier. The tournament also determines which national teams qualify for the next edition of the CONCACAF Gold Cup.

The format proposals were first formally investigated at the XXXII CONCACAF Ordinary Congress in Oranjestad, Aruba on 8 April 2017 and confirmed by CONCACAF on 16 November 2017. CONCACAF president Victor Montagliani stated that the purpose of the competition is to have a regular schedule of international fixtures for CONCACAF's national teams, noting that some teams play fewer than 10 games in a four-year period and needed more competitive games to assist the sport's development in those nations.

On 28 February 2023, CONCACAF announced a format change for the 2023–24 season of the CONCACAF Nations League. As a result, no teams will be relegated from the 2022–23 season.

The size of League A will be increased from twelve to sixteen teams, and will now feature a quarter-final round. The twelve lowest-ranked teams in the CONCACAF Rankings of March 2023 will enter the group stage, now using a Swiss-system tournament format. The teams will be divided into two groups of six teams, with each team playing four matches against group opponents (two at home and two away). The top four teams will advance to the quarter-finals, and will be joined by the four top-ranked teams in the CONCACAF Rankings. The teams advancing from the group stage will be drawn into ties against the top-ranked teams, which will be played on a two-legged home-and-away basis.

League B will remain unchanged, featuring sixteen teams divided into four groups of four. Each team will play six matches in a double round-robin home-and-away format (three at home and three away). Following the format change, League C will be reduced from thirteen to nine teams and from four to three groups. Teams will be divided into three groups of three teams, with each team playing four matches in a double round-robin home-and-away format (two at home and two away).

Promotion and relegation will resume for the 2023–24 season, with the fifth and sixth placed teams in League A and the fourth-placed teams in League B being relegated for the next season. The group winners of Leagues B and C will be promoted, as will the best second-placed team of League C.

Trophy

The CONCACAF Nations League trophy was unveiled eight days before the inaugural Nations League Finals. The trophy represents all 41 CONCACAF national associations and is made of silver-plated brass and stone.

Anthem
The official anthem of the CONCACAF Nations League is 3 minutes and 54 seconds long, and is played when the players are entering the field of play, in television sequences and for ceremonial purposes.

Seasons
Each season of the CONCACAF Nations League is typically played from September to November of an odd-numbered year (league phase), and June of the following even-numbered year (Nations League Finals of League A), meaning a CONCACAF Nations League champion is crowned every two years. An exception was made in the 2022–23 season when the league phase was played from May to September 2022, due to the 2022 FIFA World Cup played in Qatar at the end of the year.

Results

Finals

Performances by team

* = hosts

Team performances by season
 – Champions
 – Runners-up
 – Third place
 – Fourth place
 – Promoted
 – No movement
 – Relegated
Q – Qualified for upcoming CONCACAF Nations League Finals
 – Hosts of CONCACAF Nations League Finals

Broadcasters

CONCACAF

International 
All matches are streamed through CONCACAF's subscription streaming service CONCACAF GO.

See also 
 UEFA Nations League
 CONCACAF W Gold Cup – women's tournament with similar format

References

External links
 

 
Nations League
Recurring sporting events established in 2018